This is a list of the best-selling singles in 1993 in Japan, as reported by Oricon.

References

1993 in Japanese music
1993
Oricon
Japanese music-related lists